Thomas Calvert (1883–1938) was a Royal Navy officer who served during the First World War.

He commanded the heavy cruiser  in 1926–1928 and then the battlecruiser  in 1932–1933. He was in command of the 2nd Cruiser Squadron from 1936 until his death in 1938.

Citations

Bibliography
 

1883 births
1938 deaths
Royal Navy officers of World War I